Pierre André Brunet  (27 February 1908 – 12 May 1979) was a French rowing coxswain who competed in coxed pair. Together with André Giriat and Anselme Brusa he won the national title in 1927 and 1931, the European title in 1931, and an Olympic bronze medal in 1932.

References

1908 births
1979 deaths
French male rowers
Coxswains (rowing)
Olympic rowers of France
Rowers at the 1932 Summer Olympics
Olympic bronze medalists for France
Olympic medalists in rowing
Medalists at the 1932 Summer Olympics
European Rowing Championships medalists
20th-century French people